Megalocnidae is an extinct family of sloths, native to the islands of the Greater Antilles from the Early Oligocene to the Mid-Holocene. They are known from Cuba, Hispaniola and Puerto Rico, but are absent from Jamaica. While they were formerly placed in the Megalonychidae alongside two-toed sloths and ground sloths like Megalonyx, recent mitochondrial DNA and collagen sequencing studies place them as the earliest diverging group basal to all other sloths. They displayed significant diversity in body size and lifestyle, with Megalocnus being terrestrial and probably weighing several hundred kilograms, while Neocnus was likely arboreal and similar in weight to extant tree sloths, at less than 10 kilograms.

Origin 

It is thought that sloths arrived in the Caribbean from South America (where they arose) around the Eocene-Oligocene boundary about 33 million years ago, when there was a significant sea level drop caused by a glaciation episode. This has been associated with the GAARlandia (Greater Aves Antilles Ridge) hypothesis, where the Aves Ridge is suggested to have formed a land bridge during the interval, allowing overland migration into the Greater Antilles. The existence of such a land bridge has been questioned because of the lack of geological evidence for the Aves Ridge having been subaerially exposed as well as the fact that many other South American animals (such as marsupials and ungulates) are absent from the Greater Antilles, making a complete land bridge unlikely. The earliest evidence suggesting the presence of sloths in the Caribbean is a partial femur from the Early Oligocene of Puerto Rico. Other pre-Pleistocene fossil remains include Imagocnus from the Early Miocene of Cuba, and an indeterminate species from the Late Miocene of the Dominican Republic.

Taxonomy 
The taxonomy of Caribbean sloths is in flux, with the number of species present among the Pleistocene-Holocene taxa in question; some species are likely junior synonyms, while the diversity of some genera is probably understated. The mitochondrial DNA study suggests that Acratocnus ye and Parocnus serus are deeply divergent from each other, having split during the Oligocene, suggesting an early radiation within the group; they proposed the families Acratocnidae and Parocnidae within a new superfamily, Megalocnoidea.

Based on White and MacPhee (2001): and Vinola-Lopez et al. 2022

Megalocnus 
†M. rodens Pleistocene to Holocene, Cuba
Acratocnus 
 †A. odontrigonus Pleistocene, Puerto Rico
 †A. ye  Pleistocene to Holocene, Hispaniola
 †A. antillensis Pleistocene to Holocene, Cuba
Mesocnus
†Mesocnus browni Pleistocene to Holocene, Cuba
Parocnus
†Parocnus browni Pleistocene to Holocene, Cuba
 †Parocnus serus Pleistocene to Holocene, Hispaniola (Junior synonym: Megalocnus zile)
†Parocnus dominicanus Pleistocene to Holocene, Hispaniola
Neocnus
†N. gliriformis Pleistocene to Holocene, Cuba
†N. major Pleistocene to Holocene, Cuba
 †N. comes Pleistocene to Holocene, Hispaniola
 †N. dousman Pleistocene to Holocene, Hispaniola
 †N. toupiti Pleistocene to Holocene, Hispaniola
Imagocnus 
†I. zazae Early Miocene of Cuba

For other sloth taxa of the Caribbean, see Pilosans of the Caribbean.

Phylogeny
The following sloth family phylogenetic tree is based on collagen and mitochondrial DNA sequence data (see Fig. 4 of Presslee et al., 2019).

Extinction 
Sloths in the Caribbean survived about 5,000 years longer than ground sloths on the mainland. On Cuba the latest date for Megalocnus is calibrated 4700 Before Present (BP). while dates for Parocnus browni are around 6250 BP. On Hispaniola the dates for some indeterminate sloth specimens are around 5000 BP; these dates roughly coincide with the first settlement of the Caribbean, which suggests that humans were the cause of the extinction.

Notes

References 

Prehistoric sloths
Prehistoric mammal families
Mammals of the Caribbean